Eggs was an American indie rock band based in Washington, D.C., centered on Andrew Beaujon. The band was formed in 1990 in Richmond, Virginia, United States. They were active in the early to mid 1990s and was signed to prominent indie pop record label TeenBeat Records.

Discography

Albums
 Bruiser (1992) Teenbeat 76
 Teenbeat 96 Exploder (1994) Teenbeat 96
 How Do You Like Your Lobster? - A Collection Of Crustaceans And Flotsam (compilation of singles, 1995) Teenbeat 156

Singles
 "Skyscraper" / "Ocelot" (1992) Teenbeat 66
 "Pit with Spikes" / "A Sparkling Mix" (1993) Teenbeat 116
 "Sexual Tension" (1993) Jade Tree
 "The Government Administrator" / "Sugar Babe" (1993) Hemiola 3
 "Genetic Engineering" / "Genetic Engineers" (1994) Teenbeat 136

References

External links
[ AllMusic biography]
Discogs discography
Cduniverse.com entry

Indie rock musical groups from Washington, D.C.